This is an index of brand-related list articles on Wikipedia.

Lists of brands

 List of anamorphic format trade names
 List of automotive fuel brands
 List of bottle types, brands and companies
 British Rail brand names
 List of car audio manufacturers and brands
 List of celebrity-branded perfumes
 List of cigar brands
 List of cigarette brands
 List of defunct consumer brands
 List of digital camera brands
 Dunlop (brands)
 List of electronics brands
 List of firearm brands
 List of perfumes
 List of chained-brand hotels
 List of ibuprofen brand names
 List of Icelandic brands
 List of company and product names derived from indigenous peoples
 List of Italian brands
 List of La Marzocco products
 List of laptop brands and manufacturers
 List of lingerie brands
 List of rolling papers
 List of toys
 List of Marks & Spencer brands
 List of Mexican brands
 List of microbreweries
 List of common microcontrollers
 List of most valuable brands
 List of paracetamol brand names
 List of pen types, brands and companies
 List of piano brand names
 List of Procter & Gamble brands
 List of renamed products
 List of Romanian brands
 List of Royal Enfield motorcycles
 List of sewing machine brands
 List of Slovenian brands
 List of smart cards
 List of toy soldiers brands
 List of convertible tablet computer brands
 List of toothpaste brands
 List of Unilever brands
 List of video telecommunication services and product brands
 List of Walmart brands

Beverage brands

 List of cider brands
 List of Coca-Cola brands
 List of Dr Pepper Snapple brands
 List of Jones Soda flavors
 List of microbreweries
 List of Molson Coors brands
 List of Pepsi variations
 List of piscos
 List of rum producers
 List of brand name soft drinks products
 List of soft drinks by country
 List of tequilas
 List of vodkas
 List of whisky brands

Food brands

 List of brand name breads 
 List of breakfast cereals 
 List of breath mints 
 List of top-selling candy brands 
 List of chewing gum brands 
 List of chocolate bar brands 
 List of ConAgra brands 
 List of confectionery brands 
 List of brand name food products 
 List of frozen dessert brands 
 List of frozen food brands 
 List of ice cream brands 
 List of instant noodle brands 
 List of Japanese snacks 
 List of Kraft brands 
 List of mustard brands 
 List of Nestlé brands 
 List of popcorn brands 
 List of potato chip brands
 List of brand name snack foods

Sports brands

 List of bicycle brands and manufacturing companies
 List of Japanese bicycle brands and manufacturers
 List of bicycle part manufacturing companies
 List of disc golf brands and manufacturers
 List of fitness wear brands
 List of mountaineering equipment brands
 List of ski brands
 List of swimwear brands

See also

 List of lists of lists
 Lists of companies